John Howard is a British businessman and entrepreneur who works in several companies in East Anglia, and was formerly a member of the board of directors of Cambridge United football club.

He is the managing director of Auction House UK, a property auction company. He is also an equestrian owner, breeder and trainer of racehorses from his home in Suffolk, England.

Involvement with Cambridge United

One of Howard's businesses, Bideawhile 445 Ltd, was used as a vehicle to purchase the Abbey Stadium from Cambridge United for GBP 1,923,000 to lease it back to the club in November 2004 for an estimated annual rent of GBP 200,000. He subsequently refused to sell the ground back to Cambridge United, despite then United director Dr. Johnny Hon offering the club the money to buy back the ground at a price of GBP 2.2 million in April 2005.

Howard's reasoning for the refusal to sell was that "we...do not believe it is in the best interests of CUFC or Bideawhile to enter into negotiations to sell the ground at this present time". This was met with opposition from fellow directors and fans. Hon said at the time "I'm extremely disappointed that John Howard has decided not to accept the offer of £2.2 million that I made last week, especially because I understand he had told Roger Hunt and the Board that his heart and loyalty was with the Club", while U's majority shareholder Paul Barry stated that "I am very disappointed that John has turned down the offer for the Club to control its own destiny with its freehold".

The fans' reaction to Howard's refusal to sell the ground was negative. Chants of "We want our stadium back" were regularly heard at home and away fixtures while a protest was organised through Cambridge town centre prior to the final game of the 2004/05 season against Notts County by the fans' trust organisation Cambridge Fans United. Howard issued a statement that he would not be attending this fixture as it would be "in the best interests of the Club if I am not present on this occasion". 

On the evening of Tuesday 1 August Howard resigned from the board of directors.from Cambridge United's Official Website

In February 2010 Howard's company Bideawhile 445 Ltd. agreed to sell the Abbey Stadium to a property developer for GBP 3,500,000.  The sale was agreed with Grosvenor Estates, and amounted to a profit for Bideawhile of around GBP 2,500,000 – including rental receipts – since they purchased the stadium five years earlier.

Cambridge Fans United then tried to buy back the stadium by matching the sale price agreed with Grosvenor Estates. The supporters' trust attempted to get extra time to find the cash, but this was rejected by Bideawhile.

See also
Cambridge United F.C.
Cambridge Fans United

References
 

British businesspeople
Cambridge United F.C.
Living people
Year of birth missing (living people)